Paracarystus is a genus of skippers in the family Hesperiidae.

Species
The following species are recognised in the genus Paracarystus:
 Paracarystus evansi Hayward, 1938
 Paracarystus hypargyra Herrich-Schäffer, [1869]
 Paracarystus menestries (Latreille, [1824])
 Paracarystus ranka (Evans, 1955)

References

Natural History Museum Lepidoptera genus database

Hesperiinae
Hesperiidae genera